Stenden University of Applied Sciences is a state-funded professional university in the north of the Netherlands. The University is the product of the merger in 2008 of Hogeschool Drenthe and Christelijke Hogeschool Nederland. Stenden University of Applied Sciences has more than 11,000 students.

Academics 
Stenden offers 3 associate degrees, 19 bachelor programmes and 5 master programmes.

See also
Stenden Rangsit University
Stenden University Qatar

External links

  Official website

 
2008 establishments in the Netherlands
Educational institutions established in 2008
Organisations based in Drenthe
Education in Leeuwarden
Organisations based in Groningen (province)
Hospitality schools in the Netherlands